Slate Mountain is a summit in the U.S. state of Nevada.

Slate Mountain was so named on account of its material composition. A variant name is "Slate Peak".

References

Mountains of Churchill County, Nevada